Sir Robert Duncan Bell, KCSI, CIE (18 May 1878 – 14 January 1953) was a Scottish civil servant who was the Acting Governor of Bombay during the British Raj, from 30 May 1937 to 18 September 1937.

Life

Bell was the son of William Bell, a typesetter with the Edinburgh Evening News, and his wife, Christina Beveridge Malcolm. The family lived at 3 Gladstone Terrace in the Grange, Edinburgh, close to The Meadows. In 1905, Bell moved to India as a junior civil servant. He was a member of the Bombay Legislative Council in the 1920s and present during the Bombay Riots of 1928/29.

Bell became Acting Governor of Bombay on 30 May 1936, after Governor Lord Brabourne went on leave with his wife, Lady Brabourne. Bell was sworn in with a 17-gun salute.

Bell is buried with his parents in Grange Cemetery in south Edinburgh. The grave lies just to the west of the north face of the central vaults.

References

External

Governors of Bombay
Knights Commander of the Order of the Star of India
Companions of the Order of the Indian Empire
1878 births
1953 deaths
Civil servants from Edinburgh
Burials at the Grange Cemetery